Gund Brewery Lofts or the old Gund Brewing Company Bottling Works was a progressive beer-bottling factory built in 1903, designed by Louis Lehle with modern sanitization and pasteurization machines that gave Gund's beer a reliable shelf life, and electrical power that allowed an efficient plant layout. The factory has now been remodeled as apartments. It is now listed on the National Register of Historic Places.

See also

The Freight House
La Crosse Commercial Historic District
La Crosse Armory

References

External links

2130 South Avenue, Wisconsin Historical Society

National Register of Historic Places in La Crosse County, Wisconsin
Buildings and structures in La Crosse County, Wisconsin